The European Union has concluded free trade agreements (FTAs) and other agreements with a trade component with many countries worldwide and is negotiating with many others.
The European Union negotiates free trade deals on behalf of all of its member states, as the member states have granted the EU has an "exclusive competence" to conclude trade agreements. Even so, member states' governments control every step of the process (via the Council of the European Union, whose members are national ministers from each national government):
 Before negotiations start, member states' governments (via the Council of Ministers) approve the negotiating mandate;
 During negotiations, member states' governments are regularly briefed on the progress of negotiations and can update the negotiations mandate or suspend negotiations;
 Upon conclusion of negotiations, member states' governments decide whether the agreement should be signed;
 After approval from the European Parliament and (in case the agreement covers areas other than trade such as investment protection) upon ratification in each member state parliament, member states' governments decide whether the agreement should be concluded and enter into effect.

Trade agreements in force - fully ratified

Trade agreements in force - provisionally applied

Agreements finalised (negotiations concluded, but not signed)

Negotiating new agreements

Negotiations on hold

Competence

The European Court of Justice has held that investor-state arbitration provisions (including a dedicated tribunal planned by some free trade agreements) falls under competency shared between European Union and its member states and that for this reason, the ratification of such mixed agreements should be approved by the EU as well as by each of the 28 states. This court decision has resulted in a new architecture of external trade negotiations which will have two components:

 a free trade agreement - related exclusively to trade matters - which can be adopted at the EU level;
 an investment agreement - containing investment, arbitration and other non-trade provisions - which needs to be ratified by the member states as well.

Impact to consumers
One study found that the trade agreements that the EU implemented over the period 1993-2013 have, on average, increased the quality of imported goods by 7% and therefore "lowered quality-adjusted prices by close to 7%," without having much of an impact on the non-adjusted price.

See also

Economic Partnership Agreements
 EU-ACP 
 EUR.1 movement certificate
 Euro-Mediterranean free trade area
 European Union Association Agreement
 Everything but Arms
 Free trade area
 Free trade areas in Europe
 List of bilateral free trade agreements
 List of free trade agreements
 List of the largest trading partners of the European Union
 Trade deal negotiation between the UK and EU (2020)
 Trade defence instrument
 United States free trade agreements

Notes

References

External links
 Free Trade Agreements, EU Trade Helpdesk, European Commission
 Trade Flows, Animated infographics, European Parliamentary Research Service
 Articles on EU FTAs, at Agritrade
 The Transatlantic Colossus: Global Contributions to Broaden the Debate on the EU-US Free Trade Agreement A collaborative publication with over 20 articles on the global implications of the TAFTA | TTIP
 Koeth, Wolfgang (8 December 2014)  "The Deep and Comprehensive Free Trade Agreements: an Appropriate Response by the EU to the Challenges in its Neighbourhood"?

Free trade agreements of the European Union
Free trade agreements